Matheteus is a genus of beetles in the family Omethidae containing a single described species, M. theveneti.

References

Elateroidea
Monotypic Elateriformia genera
Articles created by Qbugbot